Neil McBride (13 April 1910 – 9 September 1974) was a British Labour Party politician.

He was Member of Parliament for Swansea East from a by-election in 1963 until his death, aged 64, shortly before the October 1974 general election.  He was a government whip from 1966 to 1970.

Life 
Neil McBride, named after his father, was born in Neilstown in Scotland. He attended his local Catholic school, St. Thomas's School and later the National Labour College. He worked for James Brown and Co. of Clydebank as a brass finisher until his election to parliament in 1963.

McBride's hobbies included reading and the spread of socialism. He also was a keen traveller, travelling to various parts of Europe, Africa, South America and the Middle East. He married Delia Maloney from Paisley on 12 June 1937. They lived in Brynhyfryd, Swansea.

Neil died on 9 September 1974 in his home after a seven-month illness.

Political career 
McBride began his political career by joining the Amalgamated Engineering Union in 1937 followed by the Labour Party in 1940, in addition to being part of the Co-operative Party and the Paisley Labour Party; he served as chairman of Paisley CLP 1950–62. In the October 1951, McBride contested in Perth and East Perthshire but was unsuccessful. Similarly, he lost the High Peak division of Derbyshire in 1955. From 1964 to 1966, McBride was both secretary to the PLP trades union group and chairman of the PLP transport committee.

Neil took over from D.L.Mort as the Swansea East MP in March 1963 following a by-election. He was the third Scottish man ever to represent a constituency in Wales as MP. As well as government whip1966-70, he served as Lord Commissioner to the Treasury, 1969–70. Though the Labour government was defeated in 1970, McBride maintained his role as opposition whip in parliament. In addition, he was chairman of the Welsh Labour Parliamentary Group, 1972–73. McBride won the February 1974 election by 19,687 votes but never joined the new parliament due to illness.

References 

Times Guide to the House of Commons, February 1974
https://biography.wales/article/s6-MCBR-NEI-1910

Bibliography:

Who was who? ;
Etholiadau'r Ganrif, 1885–1997, 1999;
Welsh Hustings ;
Dod's Parliamentary Companion ;
The Times, 11 Sept. 1974;
Western Mail, 10 Sept. 1974.

External links 
 

 

1910 births
1974 deaths
Amalgamated Engineering Union-sponsored MPs
Welsh Labour Party MPs
Members of the Parliament of the United Kingdom for Swansea constituencies
UK MPs 1959–1964
UK MPs 1964–1966
UK MPs 1966–1970
UK MPs 1970–1974
UK MPs 1974
Ministers in the Wilson governments, 1964–1970